Trellis Owl is a defunct programming language created by Digital Equipment Corporation.

References

Programming languages